Labedella is a Gram-positive, non-spore-forming, aerobic and non-motile genus of bacteria from the family Microbacteriaceae. Labedella is named after David P. Labeda.

References

Microbacteriaceae
Bacteria genera